Leah Vandenberg is a New Zealand-born Australian theatre, television, and film actress. She has appeared in many well-known Australian productions including the award-winning Netflix series 'The Letdown' and SBS Drama 'The Hunting'. Leah received an ASTRA nomination for 'Most Outstanding Performance by an Actor-Female' in the comedy series Stupid, Stupid Man. She is a presenter on the long-running ABC TV Kids television program Play School, a role she maintains today.

Early life and education
Vandenberg was born in New Zealand to a Sri Lankan father, who had grown up in Fiji, and an Australian mother of Irish and Scottish heritage. She studied at the Western Australian Academy of Performing Arts, graduating in 1993.

Career

On stage, Vandenberg has performed in Grace (Melbourne Theatre Company); Criminology  (Arena Theatre Company); The Country (B Sharp @ Belvoir Street); The Perfumed Garden; The Taming of the Shrew; A Clockwork Orange; and Love and Understanding.

She received a 2007 ASTRA nomination of "Most Outstanding Performance by an Actor - Female" for her role as Anne in Stupid Stupid Man (series 1 & 2).

Filmography
Vandenberg has appeared in a wide range of genres in TV series as well as a few feature films, including:

References

External links

Australian television actresses
Australian film actresses
Living people
Edith Cowan University alumni
New Zealand film actresses
New Zealand television actresses
Australian people of New Zealand descent
Australian actresses of Indian descent
New Zealand people of Indian descent
New Zealand television presenters
Australian children's television presenters
New Zealand children's television presenters
Year of birth missing (living people)
20th-century Australian actresses
21st-century Australian actresses
Australian women television presenters
New Zealand women television presenters